Walter Newton Jones (1874-1922) or Walter Jones was an American actor and singer who appeared in several popular plays in the first two decades of the 20th century. He first appeared on Broadway in 1893 in a musical play about Columbus, 1492. He appeared in the hit comedy Baby Mine with Marguerite Clark in 1910. He later appeared with Clark in her silent film Easy to Get. He only appeared in two other films The Story of a Kiss a 1912 short and The Love Bandit a 1924 feature released posthumously.

He was married to Blanche Deyo(ca.1880-1933). They had one child, a daughter who died as a child. A large rotund man, Jones died May 26, 1922 and was cremated. His ashes were dispersed into the same river Gravesend Bay his daughter's ashes had been.

Plays
Broadway appearances
1492 (1893–94)
The Man in the Moon (1899)
The Night of the Fourth (1901)
The Chaperons (1902)
Miss Pocahontas (1907)
Burlesque of The Merry Widow and The Devil (1908)
Going Some (1909)
Baby Mine (1910–11)
Just Like John (1912)
The Gentleman from Number 19 (1913)
Oh, I Say! (1913)
The Third Party (1914)
The Blue Envelope (1916)
Our Little Wife (1916)
Mary's Ankle (1917)
Rock-a-Bye Baby (1918)
Up in Mabel's Room (1919)
Getting Gertie's Garter (1921)

References

External links
Walter Jones at IMDb.com
Internet Broadway Database
 scene from "Baby Mine"(University of Washington, Sayre collection)
 Walter Jones on sheet music cover](NYPublic Library, Billy Rose collection)
cast of "Up in Mabel's Room"(NYPublic Library, Billy Rose)

1874 births
1922 deaths
Actors from Ohio
Singers from Ohio